"Rio" is a song recorded by Kosovo-Albanian rapper Ledri Vula. Lasting two minutes and thirty eight seconds, the record was solely written by the rapper himself and produced by Albanian producer Big Bang. A pop song, its lyrics talks about the rapper telling his unidentified girlfriend not to be so hard on him. An official music video for the song was shot in Brazil and was uploaded on 4 June 2019 onto YouTube in order to accompany the single's release. It visually features the rapper and Albanian model Lorena Haliti celebrating in a colorful alley of Rio de Janeiro together with Samba and Capoeira dancers.

Background and composition 

"Rio" was solely written by Ledri Vula himself and produced by his collaborator Big Bang. Swedish producer Johan Bejerholm was furthermore helmed for the record's mixing and mastering process. In terms of music notation, it was composed in  time and is performed in the key of A minor with a tempo of 125 beats per minute. An Albanian language song, its lyrics talks about the rapper telling his unidentified girlfriend not to be so hard on him.

Music video 

The accompanying music video was directed by Besian Durmishi and premiered onto the official YouTube channel of Ledri Vula on 4 June 2019, where it has since amassed a total of 11 million views. For further promotion, the song was played on the German radio station RadioMonster.FM on 17 July 2019.

The colorful clip was filmed during summer in various locations in the city of Rio de Janeiro, Brazil, and features the guest appearance from Albanian model Lorena Haliti. The visual opens with a waving Brazilian flag, and Vula walking the stairs straight up. Vula is next shown walking through his charming surroundings until he arrives to a colorful alley with fellow Samba and Capoeira dancers being present. Fellow scenes show the rapper driving a red Ferrari to pick Haliti and performing to the song alongside her and the aforementioned dancers in the alley before the music video ends.

Charts

Release history

References 

2019 songs
2019 singles
Ledri Vula songs
Albanian-language songs
Song recordings produced by Big Bang
Songs written by Ledri Vula
Music videos directed by Besian Durmishi